The World Amateur Chess Championship is a tournament organised by FIDE.
The world governing body intended to promote amateur chess play by holding championship tournaments linked to the Olympic Games, but only two events were held.

History
The first championship was held the year that FIDE was founded, at the 1924 Summer Olympics in Paris.
This is considered the unofficial first Chess Olympiad, and is the only Olympiad that was an individual event.
The second championship was held at the 1928 Summer Olympics in The Hague, in conjunction with the 2nd Chess Olympiad.

Chess has never been an official part of the Olympic Games, and since the chess community does not make any essential distinction between amateur and professional the championship was discontinued after 1928. However, in 1995 FIDE has revamped it to celebrate the centenary of the Hastings International Chess Congress and since then it has been held annually. The first renewed edition, held concurrently with the 1995/96 Hastings Congress from 28 December 1995 to 5 January 1996, was restricted to non-FIDE rated players. Subsequently, amateur was defined as a player with a FIDE rating below 2000 and not having attained a rating of more than 2000 in the past 2 years. Since 2016, the championship has been split into three rating categories: U-2300, U-2000 and U-1700.

According to the current FIDE regulations, the winner is awarded with the title of FIDE Master (FM), while the runner-up and the bronze medallist receive the Candidate Master (CM) title. Analogously the women's champion receives the title of Woman FIDE Master (WFM), silver and bronze medallists in the women's category are granted the title Woman Candidate Master (WCM).

Since 2012, there is another World Amateur Chess Championship, organised by the Amateur Chess Organisation (ACO), which is not recognised by FIDE.

Winners

See also
 1st unofficial Chess Olympiad (Paris 1924)
 2nd Chess Olympiad (The Hague 1928)

References

Amateur
1924 in chess
1928 in chess
Amateur sports